Nuti is a surname. Notable people with the surname include:

Andrea Nuti (born 1967), Italian sprinter
Bill Nuti (born 1964), American businessman
Francesco Nuti (born 1955), Italian actor, film director, and screenwriter
Giovanni Nuti (born 1998), Italian football player
Wanda Nuti, Italian gymnast